A sniper rifle is a high-precision, long-range rifle. Requirements include accuracy, reliability, mobility, concealment and optics for anti-personnel, anti-materiel and surveillance uses of the military sniper. The modern sniper rifle is a portable shoulder-fired weapon system with a choice between bolt-action or semi-automatic action, fitted with a telescopic sight for extreme accuracy and chambered for a high-ballistic performance centerfire cartridge.

History
The Whitworth rifle was arguably the first long-range sniper rifle in the world.  Designed by Sir Joseph Whitworth, a prominent British engineer, it used barrels with hexagonal polygonal rifling, which meant that the projectile did not have to bite into the rifling grooves as was done with conventional rifling.  His rifle was far more accurate than the Pattern 1853 Enfield, which had shown some weaknesses during the recent Crimean War.  At trials in 1857, which tested the accuracy and range of both weapons, Whitworth's design outperformed the Enfield at a rate of about three to one. Also, the Whitworth rifle was able to hit the target at a range of 2,000 yards, whereas the Enfield could only manage it at a distance of 1,400 yards.  During the American Civil War, the Confederate sharpshooters equipped with Whitworth rifles were tasked to kill Union field artillery crews, and were responsible for killing Major General John Sedgwick – one of the highest-ranking officers killed during the Civil War – at the Battle of Spotsylvania Court House.

During the Crimean War, the first optical sights were designed for fitting onto the rifles. Much of this pioneering work was the brainchild of Colonel D. Davidson, using optical sights produced by Chance Brothers of Birmingham. This allowed a marksman to more accurately observe and target objects at a greater distance than ever before. The telescopic sight, or scope, was originally fixed and could not be adjusted, which therefore limited its range. By the 1870s, the perfection of breech loading magazine rifles led to sniper rifles having "effective accurate" ranges of up to a mile away from its target.

During the Boer War, the latest breech-loading rifled guns with magazine and smokeless powder were used by both sides. The British were equipped with the Lee–Metford rifle, while the Boers had received the latest Mauser Model 1895 rifles from Germany. In the open terrain of South Africa, the marksman was a crucial component in battle. The Lovat Scouts was a British Army unit formed in 1899 that was renowned for the expert marksmanship and stalking skills of its personnel. The men wore ghillie suits for camouflage and were expertly skilled in observation. Hesketh Hesketh-Prichard said of them that "keener men never lived". After the Boer War, the Scouts became the first official sniper unit in the British Army.

It was not until World War I that sniper rifles began to be used more regularly in battle and certain soldiers given specialized training to use such a rifle. In Germany, these trained snipers were given rifles with telescopic sights, which illuminated at night in order to improve their accuracy. German gunsmiths fitted the scope above the barrel for optimal accuracy.

During the War, the accuracy of the sniper rifle was greatly improved. It was during World War I and II that the word ‘sniper’ began to be used commonly, whereas previously those who were armed with sniper rifles were referred to as sharpshooters, or marksmen.

These marksmen, wielding sniper rifles such as the Karabiner 98k and Mosin–Nagant Model 1891/30 sniper rifle, had a drastic and demoralizing effect on the battlefield. Soldiers would often remain hidden in foxholes or trenches so as not to expose themselves to the deadly accuracy of a sniper. Some soldiers even began to disregard orders from commanding officers to protect against potential harm, which thus broke down the chain of command on the battlefield. The sniper rifle soon acquired the reputation of being one of the most effective and ruthless weapons of war.

Though sniper rifles had proved to be extremely effective in combat, there was still a great reluctance in many militaries to adopt a trained sniper regiment. To effectively use a sniper rifle, a soldier had to go through particularly rigorous training, and most people did not make it past the first week. Sniper training was so expensive to conduct that, even until as recently as 1970, the reasoning for having trained snipers as a part of an army was deemed questionable. In Britain, sniper rifles were not seen as being an integral part of an army until after the Germans boasted so much success with sniper teams during the early months of World War I. The British army advisors supposed that the telescopic sights attached to sniper rifles were too easily damaged and thus not well suited for military use. However, they soon realized that these telescopic sights could be improved and made sturdy enough to withstand a sniper rifle shot.

Sniper rifles have continued to be used consistently throughout the later part of the 20th century in Korea, Vietnam and the Middle East as an integral part of the modern style of guerrilla warfare. The durability, accuracy and power of modern sniper rifles are beyond anything in use even 10 years ago and would seem amazing in comparison to any World War II sniper rifles. Now sniper rifles are extremely reliable and are able to fire repeatedly without losing accuracy, whereas earlier sniper rifles would lose accuracy the more consistently they were used due to wear and tear. Sniper rifles continue to be adapted and improved upon with the effective range of modern sniper rifles exceeding , which make it one of the most accurate, deadly and efficient weapons in use now.

Classification
Modern sniper rifles can be divided into two basic classes: military and law enforcement.

Military

Sniper rifles manufactured for military service are often designed for very high durability, range, reliability, sturdiness, serviceability and repairability under adverse environmental and combat conditions, at the sacrifice of a small degree of accuracy. Military snipers and sharpshooters may also be required to carry their rifles and other equipment for long distances, making it important to minimize weight. Military organizations often operate under strict budget constraints, which influences the type and quality of sniper rifles they purchase.

Law enforcement 
Sniper rifles built or modified for use in law enforcement are generally required to have the greatest possible accuracy, but do not need to have as long a range.

Law enforcement-specific rifles are usually used in non-combat (often urban) environments, so they do not have the requirement to be as hardy or portable as military versions; therefore, they may be smaller, because they do not need very long range.

Some of the first sniper rifles designed specifically to meet police and other law-enforcement requirements were developed for West German police after the Munich massacre at the 1972 Summer Olympics. Many police services and law enforcement organizations (such as the U.S. Secret Service) now use rifles designed for law enforcement purposes.

The Heckler & Koch PSG1 is one rifle specifically designed to meet these criteria and is often referred to as an ideal example of this type of sniper rifle. The FN Special Police Rifle was built for, and is marketed to, law enforcement rather than military agencies.

Distinguishing characteristics 

The features of a sniper rifle can vary widely depending on the specific tasks it is intended to perform. Features that may distinguish a sniper rifle from other weapons are the presence of a telescopic sight, unusually long overall length, a stock designed for firing from a prone position, and the presence of a bipod and other accessories.

Telescopic sight 
The single most important characteristic that sets a sniper rifle apart from other military or police small arms is the mounting of a telescopic sight, which is relatively easy to distinguish from smaller optical aiming devices found on some modern assault rifles and submachine guns.

The telescopic sights used on sniper rifles differ from other optical sights in that they offer much greater magnification (more than 4× and up to 40×), and have a much larger objective lens (40 to 50 mm in diameter) for a brighter image.

Most telescopic lenses employed in military or police roles have special reticles to aid with judgment of distance, which is an important factor in accurate shot placement due to the bullet's trajectory.

Action 
The choice between bolt-action and semi-automatic, usually recoil operated or gas operated, is usually determined by specific requirements of the sniper's role in a particular organization, with each design having advantages and disadvantages. For a given cartridge, a bolt-action rifle is cheaper to build and maintain, more reliable, and lighter, due to fewer moving parts in the mechanism. In addition, the absence of uncontrolled automatic cartridge case ejection helps avoid revealing the shooter's position. Semi-automatic weapons can serve both as battle rifle and sniper rifle, and allow for a greater rate (and hence volume) of fire. As such rifles may be modified service rifles, an additional benefit can be commonality of operation with the issued infantry rifle. A bolt action is most commonly used in both military and police roles due to its higher accuracy and ease of maintenance. Anti-materiel applications such as mine clearing and special forces operations tend to use semi-automatics.

A designated marksman rifle (DMR) is less specialized than a typical military sniper rifle, often only intended to extend the range of a group of soldiers. Therefore, when a semi-automatic action is used it is due to its ability to cross over into roles similar to the roles of standard issue weapons. There may also be additional logistical advantages if the DMR uses the same ammunition as the more common standard issue weapons. These rifles enable a higher volume of fire, but sacrifice some long range accuracy. They are frequently built from existing selective fire battle rifles or assault rifles, often simply by adding a telescopic sight and adjustable stock.

A police semi-automatic sniper rifle may be used in situations that require a single sniper to engage multiple targets in quick succession, and military semi-automatics, such as the M110 SASS, are used in similar "target-rich" environments.

Magazine 

In a military setting, logistical concerns are the primary determinant of the cartridge used, so sniper rifles are usually limited to rifle cartridges commonly used by the military force employing the rifle and match grade ammunition. Since large national militaries generally change slowly, military rifle ammunition is frequently battle-tested and well-studied by ammunition and firearms experts. Consequently, police forces tend to follow military practices in choosing a sniper rifle cartridge instead of trying to break new ground with less-perfected (but possibly better) ammunition.

Before the introduction of the standard 7.62×51mm NATO (.308 Winchester) cartridge in the 1950s, standard military cartridges were the .30-06 Springfield (7.62×63mm) (United States), .303 British (7.7×56mmR) (United Kingdom), and 7.92×57 mm Mauser (Germany). The .30-06 Springfield continued in service with U.S. Marine Corps snipers during the Vietnam War in the 1970s, well after general adoption of the 7.62×51mm. At the present time, in both the Western world and within NATO, 7.62×51mm is currently the primary cartridge of choice for military and police sniper rifles.

Worldwide, the trend is similar. The preferred sniper cartridge in Russia is another .30 caliber military cartridge, the 7.62×54mmR, which has slightly superior performance to the 7.62×51mm, although the rimmed design limits reliability compared to the latter cartridge. This cartridge was introduced in 1891, and both Russian sniper rifles of the modern era, the Mosin–Nagant and the Dragunov sniper rifle, are chambered for it.

Certain commercial cartridges designed with only performance in mind, without the logistical constraints of most armies, have also gained popularity in the 1990s. These include the 7 mm Remington Magnum (7.2×64mm), .300 Winchester Magnum (7.62×67mm), and the .338 Lapua Magnum (8.6×70mm). These cartridges offer better ballistic performance and greater effective range than the 7.62×51mm. Though they are not as powerful as .50 caliber cartridges, rifles chambered for these cartridges are not as heavy as those chambered for .50 caliber ammunition, and are significantly more powerful than rifles chambered for 7.62×51mm.

Snipers may also employ anti-materiel rifles in sniping roles against targets such as vehicles, equipment and structures, or for the long-range destruction of explosive devices; these rifles may also be used against personnel.

Anti-materiel rifles tend to be semi-automatic and of a larger caliber than other rifles, using cartridges such as the .50 BMG (12.7×99mm), 12.7×108mm, 14.5×114mm, and 20mm. These large cartridges are required to be able to fire projectiles containing payloads such as explosives, armor-piercing cores, incendiaries or combinations of these, such as the Raufoss Mk211 projectile. Due to the considerable size and weight of anti-materiel rifles, two- or three-man sniper teams become necessary.

Barrel 
Barrels are normally of precise manufacture and of a heavier cross section than more traditional barrels in order to reduce the change in impact points between a first shot from a cold barrel and a follow-up shot from a warm barrel. Unlike many battle and assault rifles, the bores are usually not chromed to avoid inaccuracy due to an uneven treatment.

When installed, barrels are often free-floated: i.e., installed so that the barrel contacts the rest of the rifle only at the receiver. A free-floating barrel avoids contact with the fore-end of the stock by the barrel itself, slings, bipods, or the sniper's hands that can interfere with barrel harmonics. The end of the barrel is usually crowned or machined to form a rebated area around the muzzle proper to avoid asymmetry or damage, and consequent inaccuracy.

External longitudinal fluting that contributes to heat dissipation by increasing the surface area, while simultaneously decreasing the weight of the barrel, is sometimes used on sniper-rifle barrels.

Sniper-rifle barrels may also utilize a threaded muzzle or combination device (muzzle brake or flash suppressor and attachment mount) to allow the fitting of a sound suppressor. These suppressors often have a means of adjusting the point of impact while fitted.

Military sniper rifles tend to have barrel lengths of 609.6 mm (24 inches) or longer, to allow the cartridge propellant to fully burn, reducing the amount of revealing muzzle flash and increasing muzzle velocity. Police sniper rifles may use shorter barrels to improve handling characteristics. The shorter barrels' muzzle velocity loss is unimportant at closer ranges; the impact velocity of the bullet is more than sufficient.

Stock 
The most common special feature of a sniper rifle stock is the adjustable cheek piece, where the shooter's cheek meets the rear of the stock. For most rifles equipped with a telescopic sight, this area is raised slightly, because the telescope is positioned higher than iron sights. A cheek piece is simply a section of the stock that can be adjusted up or down to suit the individual shooter. To further aid this individual fitting, the stock can sometimes also be adjusted for length, often by varying the number of inserts at the rear of the stock where it meets the shooter's shoulder. If the stock is manufactured from wood, environmental conditions or operational use may warp the wood, which may cause slight alignment or barrel harmonics changes over time, altering the point of impact. Stocks manufactured from polymers and metal alloys are less susceptible to point of impact shifting by environmental conditions. Sniper stocks are typically designed to avoid making contact with the barrel of the weapon and minimize the effects of environmental inconstancies. Modern sniper rifle stocks tend to be designed around a rigid chassis, offer user adjustability to allow shooters of various sizes and shapes to tailor the stock to their personal preferences and modular attachment points to provide flexibility to utilize (future) low light and day light aiming optics, laser designators, and other accessories without the need for custom made mounting interface kits.

Accessories 
An adjustable sling is often fitted on the rifle, used by the sniper to achieve better stability when standing, kneeling, or sitting. The sniper uses the sling to "lock-in" by wrapping his non-firing arm into the sling forcing his arm to be still.
Non-static weapon mounts, such as bipods, monopods and shooting sticks, are also regularly used to aid and improve stability and reduce operator fatigue. 
Shooting bags are also commonly used to help stabilize the rifle or to provide a variable base.

Capabilities

Accuracy 

A military-issue battle rifle or assault rifle is usually capable of between 3–6 minute of angle (1–2 milliradian) accuracy. A standard-issue military sniper rifle is typically capable of 1–3 MOA (0.3–1 mrad) accuracy, with a police sniper rifle capable of 0.25–1.5 MOA (0.1–0.5 mrad) accuracy. For comparison, a competition target or benchrest rifle may be capable of accuracy up to 0.15–0.3 MOA (0.05–0.1 mrad).

This average extreme spread for a 5-shot group and the accompanying hit probability are considered sufficient for effectively hitting a human shape at 800 m distance.

In 1982, a U.S. Army draft requirement for a Sniper Weapon System was: "The System will: (6) Have an accuracy of no more than 0.75 MOA (0.2 mrad) for a 5-shot group at 1,500 meters when fired from a supported, non-benchrest position". The Sniper Weapon System (M24) adopted in 1988 has a stated maximum effective range of 800 meters and a maximum allowed average mean radius (AMR) of 1.9 inches at 300 yards from a machine rest, what corresponds to a 0.6 MOA (0.17 mrad) extreme spread for a 5-shot group when using 7.62 × 51 mm M118 Special Ball cartridges.

A 2008 United States military market survey for a Precision Sniper Rifle (PSR) calls for 1 MOA (0.3 mrad) extreme vertical spread for all shots in a 5-round group fired at targets at 300, 600, 900, 1,200 and 1,500 meters. In 2009 a United States Special Operations Command market survey calls for 1 MOA (0.28 mrad) extreme vertical spread for all shots in a 10-round group fired at targets at 300, 600, 900, 1,200 and 1,500 meters.  The 2009 Precision Sniper Rifle requirements state that the PSR when fired without suppressor shall provide a confidence factor of 80% that the weapon and ammunition combination is capable of holding 1 MOA (0.28 mrad) extreme vertical spread. This shall be calculated from 150 ten (10) round groups that were fired unsuppressed. No individual group shall exceed 1.5 MOA (0.42 mrad) extreme vertical spread. All accuracy will be taken at the 1,500 meter point.

In 2008 the US military adopted the M110 Semi-Automatic Sniper System which has corresponding maximum allowed extreme spread of 1.8 MOA (0.5 mrad) for a 5-shot group on 300 feet, using M118LR ammunition or equivalent. In 2010 the maximum bullet dispersion requirement for the M24 .300 Winchester Magnum corresponds to 1.4 MOA (0.39 mrad) extreme spread for 5 shot group on 100 meters. In 2011, the US military adapted the .300 Winchester Magnum M2010 Enhanced Sniper Rifle that has to meet an accuracy requirement to fire ≤ 1 MOA/0.28 mrad (less than a 2-inch shot group at 200 yards) before being released for fielding.

Although accuracy standards for police rifles do not widely exist, rifles are frequently seen with accuracy levels from 0.5 to 1.5 MOA (0.2–0.5 mrad). For typical policing situations, an extreme spread accuracy level no better than 1 MOA (0.3 mrad) is usually all that is required. This is because police typically employ their rifles at short ranges. At 100 m or less, a rifle with a relatively low accuracy of only 1 MOA (0.3 mrad) should be able to repeatedly hit a 3 cm (1.2 inch) target. A 3 cm diameter target is smaller than the brain stem which is targeted by police snipers for its quick killing effect.

Maximum effective range 

Unlike police sniper rifles, military sniper rifles tend to be employed at the greatest possible distances so that range advantages, like the increased difficulty to spot and engage the sniper, can be exploited.

The most popular military sniper rifles (in terms of numbers in service) are chambered for 7.62 mm (0.30 inch) caliber ammunition, such as 7.62×51mm and 7.62×54mm R. Since sniper rifles of this class must compete with several other types of military weapons with similar range, snipers invariably must employ skilled fieldcraft to conceal their position.

The recent trend in specialized military sniper rifles is towards larger calibers that offer relatively favorable hit probabilities at greater range with anti-personnel cartridges such as .300 Winchester Magnum and .338 Lapua Magnum and anti-materiel cartridges such as 12.7×99mm, 12.7×108mm, and 14.5×114mm. This allows snipers to take fewer risks, and spend less time finding concealment when facing enemies that are not equipped with similar weapons.

Maximum range claims made by military organizations and materiel manufacturers regarding sniper weapon systems are not based on consistent or strictly scientific criteria. The problem is only the bullet interacts after a relatively long flight path with the target (which can also be a materiel target for a sniper bullet). This implies that variables such as the minimal required hit probability, local atmospheric conditions, properties and velocity of the employed bullet (parts), properties of the target and the desired terminal effect are major relevant factors that determine the maximum effective range of the employed system.

See also 
 List of sniper rifles
 Longest recorded sniper kills
 Long range shooting
 Precision-guided firearm
 Fully powered cartridge

Related military roles
 Designated marksman
 Scout Sniper
 Sniper

Related military weapons
 Anti-materiel rifle
 Anti-tank rifle
 Assault rifle
 Battle rifle
 Carbine rifle
 Designated marksman rifle

Notes

References

External links 

 Modern Firearms list of sniper rifles
 SniperCentral list of sniper rifles
 Tack Driving Tactical Rifle from Tac OpsDetailed overview of the accurization process for a .25 MOA rifle
 Detailed accuracy articles, by barrel maker Dan Lilja
 Detail of Russian snipers and sniper rifles of World War Two by Chris Eger, military historian
 demigodllc.com: Practical long-range rifle shooting
 Five-minute Sniper 101 Tutorial, Colonial Days to Present
 Russian will soon have a new sniper rifle 'the Tochnost'